Mudcrutch is the first studio album by American rock band Mudcrutch, released on April 29, 2008. The album was recorded during a two-week period in August 2007. Mudcrutch was originally formed in 1970. The band recorded several demos and singles but never released a record. Mudcrutch was disbanded by the record company in 1975 and did not play together again until recording this album 32 years later.  After the initial break-up, band members Tom Petty, Mike Campbell and Benmont Tench went on to form Tom Petty and the Heartbreakers.

The album entered the U.S. Billboard 200 chart at No. 8, selling about 38,000 copies in its first week.

Track listing

Personnel
Tom Petty – bass guitar, lead vocals
Mike Campbell – guitar, mandolin
Tom Leadon – guitar, vocals, lead vocal on "Queen of the Go-Go Girls", co-lead vocal on "Shady Grove"
Benmont Tench – keyboards, vocals, lead vocal on "This Is a Good Street"
Randall Marsh – drums

References

External links
 Official web site of Mudcrutch

2008 debut albums
Mudcrutch albums
Albums produced by Tom Petty
Reprise Records albums